Amol Manohar Jichkar (16 August 1978 – 25 April 2017) was an Indian cricketer. He played in six first-class and eight List A matches for Vidarbha from 1998/99 to 2001/02. He committed suicide by hanging himself. He was 38 years old.

See also
 List of Vidarbha cricketers

References

External links
 

1978 births
2017 deaths
2017 suicides
Indian cricketers
Vidarbha cricketers
Place of birth missing
Suicides by hanging in India